The .369 Nitro Express, also known as the .369 Purdey Nitro Express, is a centerfire, rifle cartridge developed by James Purdey & Sons and introduced in 1922.

Overview
The .369 Nitro Express is a rimmed cartridge originally designed for use in Purdey's own double rifles. The cartridge offers almost identical ballistic performance to the .375 H&H Flanged Magnum, firing a projectile of the same  caliber.

In his African Rifles and Cartridges, John "Pondoro" Taylor said of the .369 Nitro Express that you "would need to go a very long way to get a better general purpose weapon".

See also
List of rifle cartridges
9 mm rifle cartridges
Nitro Express

References

Footnotes

Bibliography
 Barnes, Frank C., Cartridges of the World, Gun Digest Books, Iola, 2012, .
 Kynoch Ammunition, ".369 Purdey Nitro Express", kynochammunition.co.uk,  1 January 2015.
 Taylor, John, African rifles and cartridges, Sportsman's Vintage Press, 2013, .

External links
 Ammo-One, "369 Nitro Express (Purdey)", ammo-one.com, retrieved 30 April 2017.
 Cartridgecollector, ".369 Purdey", cartridgecollector.net, retrieved 12 February 2017.
 Municon, ".369 Purdey Nitro Express", municion.org , retrieved 1 January 2015.

Pistol and rifle cartridges
British firearm cartridges
James Purdey & Sons cartridges